Shibli–Umm al-Ghanam is an Arab town at the foot of Mount Tabor in Israel's Northern District.

History
Archaeological excavations east of the village have revealed flint from the Mousterian culture, several knapped using the Levallois technique.

Ceramics from the  Byzantine  era have been found here.

Ottoman era
The population was 8 households, all Muslim. They paid  a fixed tax-rate of 25% on agricultural products, including  wheat, barley and summer crops, in addition to occasional revenues, and goats and beehives; a total of 1,910 akçe.

In 1875, Victor Guérin found here "several ancient cisterns, still unbroken, and ancient caves cut in rock, which now serve as refuge for shepherds."
In 1881  the Palestine Exploration Fund's Survey of Western Palestine found at Kh. Umm el Ghanem: "Heaps of stones, a few of which are hewn, all of small size, one small cave and one cistern."

British Mandate era
In the 1922 census of Palestine conducted  by the British Mandate authorities, Umm al Ghanam  had a population of 52, all Muslims.  In the 1931 census the population of Umm al-Ghanam was counted with that of Reineh, together they had 1015 inhabitants in a total of  243 houses.

In the 1945 statistics  the population of Umm al-Ghanam was counted with that of Mount Tabor,  and their  total land area was 8,409 dunams, according to an official land and population survey. Of this, 232 dunams  were allocated for plantations and irrigable land, 6,215 for cereals, while a total of 1,962 dunams were classified as non-cultivable land.

State of Israel
The town was formed in 1992 as a result of a municipal merger of the villages of Shibli and Umm al-Ghanam.

Shibli High School is attended by 270 Arab students, Special educational programs introduced at the school have boosted the Bagrut matriculation pass rate and percentage of graduates attending university.

Jordan Lead Codices

The so-called Jordan Lead Codices are considered by Israeli and Jordanian specialists to be fakes.

Hassan Saida of Shibli–Umm Al-Ghanam owns a collection of small cast lead books featuring what is believed to be the first-ever portrait of Jesus. The books are thought to have been created by followers of Jesus in the first decades after his crucifixion. The books, containing cryptic messages in Hebrew and ancient Greek, have been in Saida's family since they were found by his great-grandfather.

See also
 Arab localities in Israel

References

Bibliography

External links
Official website
Welcome To Umm al-Ghanam
Survey of Western Palestine, Map 6:  IAA, Wikimedia commons

Arab localities in Israel
Local councils in Northern District (Israel)
Mount Tabor